Orville Watson Mosher (November 8, 1853 – October 6, 1933) was a member of the Wisconsin State Assembly and the Wisconsin State Senate.

Biography
Mosher was born on November 8, 1853 near Waupun, Wisconsin. He graduated from Ripon College in 1879. He was the principal of the New Richmond High School from 1879 to 1883. After 1883 he engaged in milling and dealing in grain and farm produce. He was the president of the New Richmond School board for nine years. He was elected as a trustee for the St. Croix County Asylum for the Insane when it opened in 1896, and was reelected to that position several times.

He died on October 6, 1933, and is buried in New Richmond Cemetery, in New Richmond. He was married to Delia H. Mosher (née Tobie, 1845–1923).

Career
Mosher was a member of the Assembly from 1899 to 1901 and of the Senate from 1901 to 1907. He was a Republican.

References

External links
The Political Graveyard

People from New Richmond, Wisconsin
People from Waupun, Wisconsin
Millers
Businesspeople from Wisconsin
School board members in Wisconsin
Republican Party Wisconsin state senators
Republican Party members of the Wisconsin State Assembly
Ripon College (Wisconsin) alumni
1853 births
1933 deaths
Burials in Wisconsin